Stenborg is a common last name in Sweden with some famous people using this last name. including chess players, singers, and other artists.

Stenborg may refer to:

 Åke Stenborg (1926-2010), Swedish chess player
 Carl Stenborg (1752-1813), Swedish singer
 Gray Stenborg (1921–1943), New Zealand flying ace
 Gustava Johanna Stenborg, Swedish artist
 Helen Stenborg (born 1925), American stage actress
 Knut Stenborg (1890-1946), Swedish athlete
 Petter Stenborg (1719-1781), Swedish actor)

See also
 Stenberg